Fredrik Lindahl (born 22 May 1987) is a Swedish politician of the Sweden Democrats party who has been a member of the Riksdag since 2018.

Lindahl represents the constituency of Stockholm County and holds seat 321 in parliament. He is a member of the Constitution Committee and a deputy for the Riksdag's Council for the National Audit Office. Lindahl has also been the district chairman in Stockholm County for the Sweden Democrats.

References 

1984 births
Living people
People from Täby Municipality
Members of the Riksdag 2018–2022
Members of the Riksdag from the Sweden Democrats
Members of the Riksdag 2022–2026
21st-century Swedish politicians